Why Marriage Matters: America, Equality, and Gay People's Right to Marry is a 2004 book by Evan Wolfson in which the author advocates the legal recognition of same-sex marriage. It was published by Simon & Schuster.

Reviews

2004 non-fiction books
2000s LGBT literature
American non-fiction books
Books about same-sex marriage
Books by Evan Wolfson
English-language books
LGBT literature in the United States
Simon & Schuster books